This article show all participating team squads at the 2015 FIVB Volleyball World League, played by thirty-two countries with the final round held in different countries.

Group 1

Pool A

The following is the Australian roster in the 2015 FIVB Volleyball World League.

Head coach:  Roberto Santilli

The following is the Brazilian roster in the 2015 FIVB Volleyball World League.

Head coach: Bernardo Rezende

The following is the Italian roster in the 2015 FIVB Volleyball World League.

Head coach: Mauro Berruto

The following is the Serbian roster in the 2015 FIVB Volleyball World League.

Head coach: Nikola Grbić

Pool B

The following is the Iranian roster in the 2015 FIVB Volleyball World League.

Head coach:  Slobodan Kovač

The following is the Polish roster in the 2015 FIVB Volleyball World League.

Head coach: Stephane Antiga

The following is the Russian roster in the 2015 FIVB Volleyball World League.

Head coach: Andrey Voronkov

The following is the United States roster in the 2015 FIVB Volleyball World League.

Head coach:  John Speraw

Group 2

Pool C

The following is the Argentine roster in the 2015 FIVB Volleyball World League.

Head coach: Julio Velasco

The following is the Bulgarian roster in the 2015 FIVB Volleyball World League.

Head coach: Plamen Konstantinov

The following is the Canadian roster in the 2015 FIVB Volleyball World League.

Head coach: Glenn Hoag

The following is the Cuban roster in the 2015 FIVB Volleyball World League.

Head coach: Rodolfo Sánchez

Pool D

The following is the Czech roster in the 2015 FIVB Volleyball World League.

Head coach: Zdeněk Šmejkal

The following is the French roster in the 2015 FIVB Volleyball World League.

Head coach: Laurent Tillie

The following is the Japanese roster in the 2015 FIVB Volleyball World League.

Head coach: Masashi Nambu

The following is the South Korean roster in the 2015 FIVB Volleyball World League.

Pool E

The following is the Belgian roster in the 2015 FIVB Volleyball World League.

The following is the Finnish roster in the 2015 FIVB Volleyball World League.

The following is the Dutch roster in the 2015 FIVB Volleyball World League.

The following is the Portuguese roster in the 2015 FIVB Volleyball World League.

Group 3

Pool F

The following is the Montenegrin roster in the 2015 FIVB Volleyball World League.

The following is the Puerto Rican roster in the 2015 FIVB Volleyball World League.

The following is the Tunisian roster in the 2015 FIVB Volleyball World League.

The following is the Turkish roster in the 2015 FIVB Volleyball World League.

Pool G

The following is the Chinese roster in the 2015 FIVB Volleyball World League.

The following is the Greek roster in the 2015 FIVB Volleyball World League.

The following is the Mexican roster in the 2015 FIVB Volleyball World League.

The following is the Slovakian roster in the 2015 FIVB Volleyball World League.

Pool H

The following is the Egyptian roster in the 2015 FIVB Volleyball World League.

The following is the Kazakhstani roster in the 2015 FIVB Volleyball World League.

The following is the Spanish roster in the 2015 FIVB Volleyball World League.

The following is the Venezuelan roster in the 2015 FIVB Volleyball World League.

References

External links
Official website

2015
2015 in volleyball